Palarivattom is a station of Kochi Metro. The station served as the south terminus of the line until the extension to Maharaja's College was opened on 3 October 2017. The station is now located between Changampuzha Park and J. L. N. Stadium. The name of the station originates from Palarivattom, the area it is located.

It was inaugurated by the Prime Minister of India Narendra Modi on 17 June and opened for public on 19 June 2017 as a part of the first stretch of the metro system, between Aluva and Palarivattom.

References

Kochi Metro stations
Railway stations in India opened in 2017